Israel was represented by the artist Izhar Cohen, with the song "Olé, Olé", at the 1985 Eurovision Song Contest, which took place on 4 May in Gothenburg, Sweden. "Olé, Olé" was the winner of the Israeli national final, held on 28 March. This was the second time Cohen was in the Eurovision Song Contest, the previous time Cohen was in the ESC was in 1978 with Alphabeta with the song A-Ba-Ni-Bi (I love you).

Before Eurovision

Kdam Eurovision 1985 
The Kdam Eurovision 1985 final was held at the Binyaney Ha'uma in Jerusalem, hosted by Dalia Mazor and Nathan Datner. 14 songs took part and the winner was chosen by the votes of 7 regional juries.

Spokespersons
Be'er TuviaDani Lewinstein
Haifa
Kiryat Malakhi
Jerusalem
Kfar MasarykMoti Eden
Tel-Aviv
NetanyaBenny Uri

At Eurovision 
On the night of the final Cohen performed 11th in the running order, following Germany and preceding Italy. At the close of voting, "Olé, Olé" had received 93 points, placing Israel 5th of the 19 entries. The Israeli jury awarded its 12 points to Norway.

Voting

References 

1985
Countries in the Eurovision Song Contest 1985
Eurovision